The Rosengartenspitze (Italian Cima Catinaccio, Ladin Ciadenac) is a mountain in the Dolomites in South Tyrol, Italy.

See also
 Kesselkogel
 Rosengarten group

References

External links 

 Alpenverein South Tyrol 

Mountains of the Alps
Mountains of South Tyrol
Dolomites